Mark Precious (born 29 August 1956) is a former field hockey player, who won the bronze medal with the British team at the 1984 Summer Olympics in Los Angeles. Precious had studied at University College, Oxford.

References

External links
 
 

1956 births
Living people
British male field hockey players
Olympic field hockey players of Great Britain
Field hockey players at the 1984 Summer Olympics
Olympic bronze medallists for Great Britain
Olympic medalists in field hockey
Sportspeople from Scarborough, North Yorkshire
People educated at Scarborough College
Alumni of University College, Oxford
Medalists at the 1984 Summer Olympics